Nicholas David Skelton  (born 30 December 1957, Bedworth, Warwickshire) is a British former equestrian who competed in show jumping. He retired at the age of 59 years old, on 5 April 2017. He began riding at age 18 months and in 1975 took two team silvers and an individual gold at the Junior European Championships.

He has competed numerous times at the European Show Jumping Championships, winning three golds, three silvers and three bronzes both individually and with the British team over a 26-year time period. In 1980 he competed in the Alternative Olympics where he helped the British team to a silver medal. He currently holds the British Show Jumping High Jump record, which he set in 1978.

His most notable successes occurred in back to back Olympic Games in the swansong of his career. In 2012, at the age of 54, Skelton won the Olympic gold medal as part of the winning Great Britain team. In 2016, at the age of 58, Skelton won the Individual Olympic gold medal at his seventh Olympic Games. Having won both team and individual Olympic gold, Skelton and his horse, Big Star, retired together, shortly after the 2016 Games.

Education
Skelton was educated at Bablake School in the city of Coventry in Central England.

Life and career
Skelton rode in pony classes with little tuition before taking his pony to Ted and Liz Edgar for help when he was 14. He worked for and helped at The Edgars for two years before leaving school with no qualifications to work full-time for them. Skelton had plenty of early success with a horse called Maybe, but he went lame just before the Junior European Championships in 1975 and his place in the team looked lost, however O.K a reputedly ordinary horse substituted and Skelton won individual gold. After this Skelton began riding more of the Edgar horses, and in 1978 jumped just over 7-foot 7 inches to set a new British record at Olympia with Lastic. When Skelton partnered with St James the following year he broke into the senior GB team, of which he has been an integral part ever since.

In 1985 Skelton split from the Edgars and went on his own; his main horse at the time, Apollo, went with him and together they formed a partnership that won nearly all the top prizes in the sport, as well as many Championship medals. After Apollo, Skelton competed at the top level with many different horses before he teamed up with Dollar Girl in 1992 with the specific target of competing at the Barcelona Olympics. Despite the Olympics going badly for them, Skelton and Dollar Girl ultimately won the coveted World Cup Final in Gothenburg in 1995.

Skelton broke his neck in September 2000 which could have ended his show jumping career, but after retiring in 2001 he recovered and began competing again in 2002. Skelton returned to the saddle to partner Arko III, a horse he had been riding as a youngster before breaking his neck. Together Skelton and Arko won the British Open title in 2004 at the British Open Show Jumping Championships and many other top prizes. Their most disappointing moment came at the Athens Olympics in 2004 where they were leading until the final round.

After Arko retired, Skelton revisited an old friend and owner for support and new horses, Gary and Beverley Widdowson now own his competition horses that include Carlo 273, his European Individual Bronze medal partner, Big Star and Unique.

He has written an autobiography, Only Falls And Horses, and will soon publish an updated version.

He has two sons with his first wife Sarah Skelton (née Edwards) and both are active in horse racing. Daniel is a National Hunt trainer, and Harry is a National Hunt jockey who in 2009 became the youngest winner of the Irish Grand National on Niche Market and in 2020 won the Queen Mother Champion Chase at the Cheltenham Festival.

He was appointed Officer of the Order of the British Empire (OBE) in the 2012 Birthday Honours for services to equestrian sport.

Following his Olympic 2012 gold medal the post boxes in both Alcester, where he resides, and in Bedworth, where he was born, were painted gold in his honour.

Skelton won gold in the 2016 Rio Olympics in the individual category.  In doing so he became the oldest British Olympic gold medallist since 1908. Following Skelton's success at the 2016 Rio Olympics, rail operator London Midland honoured him with a gold painted sign at Bedworth railway station. Skelton received a nomination for the 2016 BBC Sports Personality of the Year Award. He received 109,197 votes, placing him third. He was appointed Commander of the Order of the British Empire (CBE) in the 2017 New Year Honours for services to equestrianism.

Major achievements

Skelton has had many successes at home and abroad and has ridden on over 164 Nations Cups teams (1978–2011). He has won various medals both as an Individual and as part of the teams in the Olympics, World Championships and European Championships between 1980 and 2016.

Olympic Games
2012: London. Team Gold medal with Big Star
2016: Rio. Individual Gold medal with Big Star
Alternative Olympic Games
1980: Rotterdam. Team Silver medal with Maybe
World championships
1982: Dublin. Team Bronze medal with If Ever
1986: Aachen. Team Silver medal and individual Bronze medal with Apollo
1990: Stockholm. Team Bronze medal with Grand Slam
1998: Rome. Team Bronze medal with Hopes are High
European Championships
1985: Dinard. Team Gold medal and individual 4th with St. James
1987: St. Gallen. Team Gold medal and Individual Bronze medal with Apollo
1989: Rotterdam. Team Gold medal with Apollo
1991: La Baule. Team Silver medal with Phoenix Park
1993: Gijon. Team Silver medal with Dollar Girl
1995: St. Gallen. Team Silver medal with Dollar Girl
2011: Madrid. Team Bronze and individual Bronze medal with Carlo 273
Junior European Championships
1974: Lucerne. Team Silver medal with Maybe
1975: Dornbirn. Team Silver medal and individual Gold medal with O.K.
Volvo World Cup Final
1995: Gothenburg. Winner with Dollar Girl
Hickstead Derby
1987: Winner with J Nick
1988: Winner with Apollo
1989: Winner with Apollo
King George V Gold Cup
1984: Winner with St. James
1993: Winner with Limited Edition
1996: Winner with Cathleen III
1999: Winner with Hopes are High

Skelton currently holds the British Show Jumping High Jump record, at 7 ft 7in 5/16th (2.32m) set at Olympia in 1978 with Lastic.

Horses

Top horses that Skelton has ridden include Maybe, If Ever, Apollo, St. James, Major Wager, Top Gun, Grand Slam, Phoenix Park, Dollar Girl, Limited Edition, Showtime, Tinka's Boy, Hopes are High, Russel and Arko III.

Skelton's current top flight horses are Big Star, Carlo 273 and Unique, all of which are owned by Beverley Widdowson.

Skelton won team gold at his home Olympics in London 2012 with his horse Big Star, alongside Ben Maher, Peter Charles and Scott Brash.

Career statistics

Individual wins

Nation's Cup wins

International Championship Results

See also
 2012 Olympics gold post boxes in the United Kingdom

References

Bibliography
 Skelton, N. (2001) Only Falls and Horses. Greenwater.

External links

  Official Nick Skelton website
 BSJA profile
 FEI Rider's Biography

1957 births
Living people
People from Bedworth
English male equestrians
British show jumping riders
Olympic equestrians of Great Britain
Equestrians at the 1988 Summer Olympics
Equestrians at the 1992 Summer Olympics
Equestrians at the 1996 Summer Olympics
Equestrians at the 2004 Summer Olympics
Equestrians at the 2008 Summer Olympics
Equestrians at the 2012 Summer Olympics
Equestrians at the 2016 Summer Olympics
Olympic gold medallists for Great Britain
English Olympic medallists
Olympic medalists in equestrian
Medalists at the 2012 Summer Olympics
Medalists at the 2016 Summer Olympics
Commanders of the Order of the British Empire
People educated at Bablake School
English autobiographers